The Wilson Sisters may refer to:

 Jane and Louise Wilson, British artists, often known as part of the Young British Artists (YBA) generation
 Ann and Nancy Wilson, the only constant members of the rock band Heart
 Brittany and Tiffany Wilson, the sisters impersonated by Shawn and Marlon Wayans in the movie White Chicks
 Carnie and Wendy Wilson, members of the pop group Wilson Phillips
 The Wilsons (album), recorded with Brian Wilson
 Vicki, Kelly, and Amanda Wilson, three New Zealand equestrian sisters famous for taming Kaimanawa horses

See also
 Bad Animals Studio